Schippia concolor, the mountain pimento or silver pimeto, is a medium-sized palm species that is native to Belize and Guatemala. Named for its discoverer, Australian botanist William A. Schipp, the species is threatened by habitat loss. It is the sole species in the genus Schippia.

Description
Schippia concolor is a medium-sized, single-stemmed palm with fan-shaped (or palmate) leaves.

Taxonomy

Schippia is a monotypic genus—it includes only a single species, S. concolor. In the first edition of Genera Palmarum (1987), Natalie Uhl and John Dransfield placed the genus Schippia in the subfamily Coryphoideae, the tribe Corypheae and the subtribe Thrinacinae Subsequent phylogenetic analysis showed that the Old World and New World members of the Thrinacinae are not closely related.  As a consequence of this, Schippia and related genera have been placed in their own tribe, Cryosophileae.  Within this tribe, Schippia appears to be most closely related to the genus Cryosophila.

The species was discovered by Australian botanist William A. Schipp in 1932 and described by German taxonomist Max Burret in 1933. Burret named the genus in honour of Schipp. The holotype upon which the species (and the genus) was based, was Schipp's collection, assigned the collection number S367. This specimen was destroyed when the Berlin Herbarium was bombed during the Second World War.

Reproduction and growth
Schippia concolor exhibit the unusual strategy of transferring all stored resources from the seed to the seedling before any shoot growth occurs. In most plants, the seedling remains attached to the seed, gradually using the stored resources for growth, until those resources are exhausted. At that point, the connection withers, detaching the remains of the seed.

Eight to nine days after the seed is hydrated, the cotyledon expands, pushes out of the seed, and grows downward into the soil. By the thirtieth day the lower  are swollen, and about half the reserves in the seed have been mobilised. At about this point in time, the young root (the radicle) emerges. Sixty days after germination the transfer of reserved from the seed has been completed, but it is only after 80 or 90 days that the young shoot (the plumule) emerges from the cotyledon.

References

Coryphoideae
Flora of Belize
Flora of Guatemala
Monotypic Arecaceae genera
Taxonomy articles created by Polbot
Taxa named by Max Burret